No Comment is the first live album by Serbian rock band Van Gogh. The album was recorded on the band's concerts held on January 23 and 24, 1997 in Studentski kulturni centar in Belgrade.

The track "Zemlja čuda" features a medley inspired by Lou Reed's "Walk on the Wild Side", The Doors' "Light My Fire", The Rolling Stones' "You Can't Always Get What You Want", Stereo MCs' "Connected", and Elvis Presley's "Can't Help Falling in Love".

Track listing
The album back cover and inner sleeve do not feature song titles, but different colors in the places where song titles should be. These are the correct titles:

"Extaza" – 4:37
"Manitua mi" – 3:18
"Gubiš me" – 4:05
"SP & SP" – 2:19
"Haleluja" – 4:32
"Zemlja čuda" – 10:53
"Tragovi prošlosti"  – 4:36
"Klatno"  – 3:50
"Buldožer" – 4:32
"Sreća" – 7:04
"Basna" – 3:53
"Kiselina"  – 5:12
"Neko te ima"  – 6:34

Personnel
Zvonimir Đukić - guitar vocals
Aleksandar Barać - bass guitar
Srboljub Radivojević - drums

Additional personnel
Gordana Svilarević - backing vocals
Ceca Slavković - backing vocals
Vlada Negovanović - producer, recorded by

Legacy 
The version of the song "Klatno" from the album was polled in 2000 as 40th on Rock Express Top 100 Yugoslav Rock Songs of All Times list.

References 

No Comment at Discogs
 EX YU ROCK enciklopedija 1960-2006,  Janjatović Petar;

External links
No Comment at Discogs

1997 live albums
Van Gogh (band) live albums
Metropolis Records (Serbia) live albums